Shri Pillappa College of Engineering is an engineering college in north Bangalore, Karnataka, India. It is affiliated to Visvesvaraya Technological University in Belgaum, and has the approval of the All India Council for Technical Education. It offers courses in mechanical engineering, civil engineering, electronics and communication engineering, computer science engineering and information science.

Academic profile 
All the engineering departments and the school of architecture are accredited by the AICTE. Students are joined to postgraduate courses based on their Common Entrance Test scores.

Courses offered 
 Mechanical engineering
 Civil engineering
 Electronics and communication engineering
 Computer science and engineering
 Information science and engineering

Gallery

See also 

 List of engineering colleges affiliated to Visvesvaraya Technological University
 Visvesvaraya Institute of Advanced Technology

References

External links 

 

Engineering colleges in Bangalore
Affiliates of Visvesvaraya Technological University
2012 establishments in Karnataka
Educational institutions established in 2012